Washington is a village and civil parish in the Horsham District of West Sussex, England. In the 2001 census 1,930 people lived in 703 households, of whom 820 were economically active. At the 2011 Census the population of the civil parish was 1,867.

The village lies at the foot of the South Downs escarpment. The Anglican parish church is dedicated to St Mary. There is one pub, the Frankland Arms, a primary school and a village hall with an adjoining sports field. The hamlet named Rock lies to the north of the A283 road.

Landmarks
Chanctonbury Ring, a hill fort based ring of trees atop Chanctonbury Hill on the South Downs, lies on the border of the parish and the neighbouring parish of Wiston. Chanctonbury Hill is a Site of Special Scientific Interest as an uncommon woodland type on a chalk escarpment, providing habitat for many species including the protected Great Crested Newt.

Notable people
John Ireland lived in a converted windmill in Washington for the final years of his life and died there.

References

External links
 includes photograph of church
 Official Website Of The Washington Parish Council

Horsham District
Villages in West Sussex